The Van Liew Cemetery is located at 585 Georges Road in North Brunswick, Middlesex County, New Jersey. It also has an entrance from Pine Street. The cemetery is one of the oldest in the township.

Around 1966, Alfred Yorston removed 520 bodies from the First Presbyterian Church, New Brunswick's cemetery to Van Liew Cemetery to make way for new construction at that church.

Notable burials
 Garnett Bowditch Adrain (1815–1878) US Congressman
 J. Edward Crabiel (d. 1992) of Milltown, New Jersey, a Democrat. Alternate delegate to the 1948 Democratic National Convention from New Jersey; member of New Jersey General Assembly, 1953–65; member of New Jersey Senate, 1966–77; Secretary of State of New Jersey, 1974–77.
 Arthur Gottlieb (1918–1965) Pro football player
 Littleton Kirkpatrick (1797–1859), represented  in the United States House of Representatives from 1853 to 1855, and was mayor of New Brunswick in 1841 and 1842.
 James E. Mills (1878–1965) Husband of Eleanor Mills of Hall-Mills Murder
 Charlotte E. Mills (1906–1952), daughter of James and Eleanor
 John Neilson (1745–1833) of New Jersey. Delegate to Continental Congress from New Jersey, 1778; delegate to New Jersey state constitutional convention, 1790; member of New Jersey state legislature, 1800–01.
 Charles Van Liew Booream of Milltown, New Jersey, a Democrat. Delegate to 1932 Democratic National Convention from New Jersey.
 Eleanor Reinhardt Mills (1888–1922), of Hall-Mills Murder
 William Paterson (1745–1806), Signer of the US Constitution (cenotaph)
 Micah Williams (1782–1837), painter

References

External links 
 
Political Graveyard: Van Liew Cemetery

Cemeteries in Middlesex County, New Jersey
North Brunswick, New Jersey